Abdel Majid Saleh is a Shia Lebanese member of parliament representing the Tyre district. He is a member of the Amal Movement led by Nabih Berri which is part of the opposition. He was first elected in 2005 to replace recently deceased MP Ali Amine and was re-elected in 2009.

See also
 Lebanese Parliament
 Members of the 2009-2013 Lebanese Parliament
 Amal Movement

References

Living people
Members of the Parliament of Lebanon
Lebanese Shia Muslims
Amal Movement politicians
Year of birth missing (living people)